Events from the year 1744 in France

Incumbents
 Monarch – Louis XV

Events
30 September – Battle of Madonna dell'Olmo
Planned French invasion of Britain

Births

8 November – Pierre Jean Van Stabel, naval officer (died 1797)

Full date missing
Jean-Jacques Boisard, fabulist (died 1833)
Marc Marie, Marquis de Bombelles, diplomat (died 1822)

Deaths
13 February – Pierre Gobert, painter (born 1662)
29 June – André Campra, composer and conductor (born 1660)
17 July – Charles d'Orléans de Rothelin, clergyman (born 1691)
10 August – Marc Marie, Marquis de Bombelles, clergyman (born 1677)

See also

References

1740s in France